Robert L. Shevin (January 19, 1934 – July 11, 2005) was the Florida Attorney General from 1971 until 1979 and a judge on the Florida Third District Court of Appeal.

Background
Robert Shevin was born in Miami, Florida. He received his bachelor's degree from the University of Florida in 1955, and his Juris Doctor from the University of Miami in 1957. He also attended New York University School of Law.

Shevin was elected to the Florida House of Representatives in 1964 and the Florida State Senate in 1966. He was elected Attorney General in 1970 and re-elected in 1974. Shevin was an unsuccessful candidate for Governor of Florida in 1978. He led the first round of the Democratic Primary, but was defeated in the runoff by Bob Graham.

Florida Legislature
He served in the Florida House of Representatives from 1964 to 1966 and the Florida Senate from 1966 to 1970.

Judicial Service
He served as Judge for the Florida Third District Court of Appeal from 1996 to 2005. He was appointed by Governor Lawton Chiles.

References

University of Florida alumni
Florida Attorneys General
Democratic Party members of the Florida House of Representatives
Democratic Party Florida state senators
1934 births
2005 deaths
20th-century American politicians
Politicians from Miami
Jewish American people in Florida politics
Judges of the Florida District Courts of Appeal
20th-century American judges
20th-century American Jews
21st-century American Jews